Indian Telly Award for Fresh New Face - Female  is an award given by Indiantelevision.com as part of its annual Indian Telly Awards for TV serials.

List of winners

2000s
2001 Not Awarded
2002 Not Awarded
2003 Not Awarded
2004 Aamna Shariff - Kahiin To Hoga as Kashish  
Geetanjali Tikekar - Kasautii Zindagii Kay as Aparna
Jasmeet Walia (Mona Singh) - Jassi Jaissi Koi Nahin as Jassi
Shama Sikander - Ye Meri Life Hai as Pooja
Sai Deodhar - Saara Akaash as Flight Lt Monica
2005 Mona Wasu - Miilee as Miilee 
Priya Wal - Remix as Anvesha Bannerjee
Kulraj Randhawa - Kareena Kareena as Kareena
Neha Bamb - Kaisa Ye Pyar Hai as Kripa
Amrita Saluja - Time Bomb 9/11 as Roma
2006 Prachi Desai - Kasamh Se as Bani (tied with) Rajshree Thakur - Saat Phere-Saloni Ka Safar as Saloni 
Kanchi Kaul - Ek Ladki Anjaani Si as Ananya Sachdeva
Priyanka Bassi - Bombay Talking as Sheena
Sanjeeda Sheikh - Kyaa Hoga Nimmo Kaa as Nimmo
Mouni Roy - Kyunki Saas Bhi Kabhi Bahu Thi as Krishnatulsi
2007 Divyanka Tripathi - Banoo Mein Teri Dulhann as Vidya 
Twinkle Bajpai - Ghar Ki Lakshmi Betiyaan as Lakshmi
Pallavi Subhash - Karam Apnaa Apnaa as Gauri Shiv Kapoor
Shalini Chandran - Kahaani Ghar Ghar Ki as Maithili
Suhasi Dhami - Aek Chabhi Hai Padoss Mein as Urmi
Shubhangi Atre Poorey - Kasturi as Kasturi
2008 Avika Gor - Balika Vadhu as Anandi
Sara Khan - Sapna Babul Ka...Bidaai as Sadhna
Parul Chauhan - Sapna Babul Ka...Bidaai as Ragini
Additi Gupta - Kis Desh Mein Hai Meraa Dil as Heer
Abigail Jain - Kya Dill Mein Hai as Kakoon
2009 Hina Khan - Yeh Rishta Kya Kehlata Hai as Akshara
Rubina Dilaik - Choti Bahu as Radhika 
Ankita Lokhande - Pavitra Rishta as Archana
Kritika Kamra - Kitani Mohabbat Hai as Arohi Sharma
Shivshakti Sachdev - Sabki Laadli Bebo as Bebo

2010s

2010 Anupriya Kapoor - Tere Liye as Tani 
Pratyusha Banerjee - Balika Vadhu as Anandi
Smriti Kalra - 12/24 Karol Bagh as Simran
Neha Jhulka - Dill Mill Gayye as Dr. Naina Mehta
Neha Sargam - Chand Chupa Badal Mein as Nivedita
2011 No Award
2012 Aakanksha Singh - Na Bole Tum Na Maine Kuch Kaha as Megha Mohan Bhatnagar
Mitali Nag - Afsar Bitiya as Krishna Raj
Aishwarya Sakhuja - Saas Bina Sasural as Tanya Tej Prakash Chaturvedi (Toasty)
Soumya Seth - Navya as Navya Anant Bajpai
Deepika Singh - Diya Aur Baati Hum as Sandhya Sooraj Rathi
Kirti Nagpure - Parichay—Nayee Zindagi Kay Sapno Ka as Siddhi Kunal Chopra
2013 Disha Parmar - Pyaar Ka Dard Hai Meetha Meetha Pyaara Pyaara as Pankhuri Aditya Kumar'  
Ekta Kaul - Rab Se Sohna Isshq as Sahiba Ranveer Singh
Shiny Doshi - Saraswatichandra as Kusum Danny Vyas
Surbhi Jyoti - Qubool Hai as Zoya Siddiqui
Roopal Tyagi - Sapne Suhane Ladakpan Ke as Gunjan
Shamin Mannan - Sanskaar – Dharohar Apnon Ki as Bhoomi Jaikishan Vaishnav
2014 Paridhi Sharma - Jodha Akbar as Jodha 
Pooja Sharma - Mahabharat as Draupadi
Digangana Suryavanshi - Ek Veer Ki Ardaas...Veera as Veera
Farnaz Shetty - Ek Veer Ki Ardaas...Veera as Gunjan
Preetika Rao - Beintehaa as Aaliya Zain Abdullah
Harshita Gaur - Sadda Haq as Sanyukta Agarwal
 2015 Radhika Madan - Meri Aashiqui Tum Se Hi as Ishaani
 2019 Aakriti Sharma - Kullfi Kumarr Bajewala as Kullfi

References

Indian Telly Awards